Adamangalam-Pudur is a village panchayat  in the foot of Javvadu hill ranges in the Kalasapakkam Taluk of Tiruvannamalai district, Tamil Nadu, India.  It has a population of 2100. It is nearly 20 km from the nearby town Polur and 40 km from the district capital. The Famous Manju Virattu is held on pongal once a year. It was arranged by the people of Adamangalam Pudhur and the  Agamudaya Thuluva Vellalar community . Thousands of peoples enjoy the Manju Virattu event .

Geography

References

External links
 Satellite image of Kalasapakkam

Cities and towns in Tiruvannamalai district